Milić is a Serbian given name and surname, and Croatian surname. People with the name include:

Given name
 Milić od Mačve (1934-2000), Serbian painter and artist
 Milić Vukašinović (born 1950), Serbian musician

Surname
 Antonio Milić (born 1994), Croatian footballer
 Borislav Milić (1925-1986), Chess grandmaster 
 Đorđe Milić (21st century), Yugoslav professional football player and manager
 Goran Milić (born 1946), Croatian Journalist
 Hrvoje Milić (born 1989), Croatian footballer
 Maks Baće Milić (1914-2005), Croatian and Yugoslav soldier
 Srđan Milić (born 1965), Montenegrin politician

See also

 Milič (disambiguation), including Milíč
 Milići (disambiguation)
 Miliće, a village in Serbia

Serbian masculine given names
Serbian surnames
Croatian surnames